Peter Stjernberg (born 24 August 1970) is a Swedish wrestler. He competed in the men's Greco-Roman 52 kg at the 1988 Summer Olympics.

References

External links
 

1970 births
Living people
Swedish male sport wrestlers
Olympic wrestlers of Sweden
Wrestlers at the 1988 Summer Olympics
Sportspeople from Skåne County